Mud is the fourth studio album by American country rock band Whiskey Myers. It was released on September 9, 2016, through Wiggy Thump Records in the United States.

Track listing

Personnel

Whiskey Myers 
 Cody Cannon - lead vocals, rhythm guitar
 John Jeffers - guitars, vocals
 Cody Tate - guitars, vocals
 Gary Brown - bass
 Jeff Hogg - drums, percussion
 Tony Kent - percussion

Additional musicians 
 Jon Knudson - dobro, fiddle, Hammond B3, mandolin, piano, vocals 
 Jim Hoke - horns
 Kristen Rogers - backing vocals

Production 
 Dave Cobb - producer
 Shane Stern - production coordination
 Eddie Spear - engineer
 Pete Lyman - mastering

Reception
Writing for PopMatters, Jasper Bruce concluded that the album is "a clear affirmation of Whiskey Myers’ place amongst the pre-eminent country acts of the millennial generation." In his review for Classic Rock, Paul Lester gave Mud three and a half stars (out of five). The Austin Chronicle panned the album writing that the band is at its best when it "channel[s] deep soul roots" but that "sadly, those moments are few and far between."

References

External links
 

2016 albums
Whiskey Myers albums